The 2018 Overton's 400 was a Monster Energy NASCAR Cup Series race that was held on July 1, 2018 at Chicagoland Speedway in Joliet, Illinois. Contested over 267 laps on the  intermediate speedway, it was the 17th race of the 2018 Monster Energy NASCAR Cup Series season. The race would become best known for its intense finish, and for producing arguably one of the best finishes in NASCAR history, as Kyle Busch and Kyle Larson dueled in the closing laps of the race for the win.

Report

Background

Chicagoland Speedway is a  tri-oval speedway in Joliet, Illinois, southwest of Chicago. The speedway opened in 2001 and currently hosts NASCAR racing. Until 2011, the speedway also hosted the IndyCar Series, recording numerous close finishes including the closest finish in IndyCar history. The speedway is owned and operated by International Speedway Corporation and located adjacent to Route 66 Raceway.

Entry list

Practice

First practice

Final practice

Qualifying

Starting Lineup

† The cars of Martin Truex Jr., Denny Hamlin, Jimmie Johnson, and Chris Buescher all started in the rear of the field after failing post-qualifying inspection.

Race

Stage Results

Stage 1
Laps: 80

Stage 2
Laps: 80

Final Lap
With 4 laps to go, Kyle Busch built a full second lead over Kyle Larson but Larson was closing the gap fast. With 3 to go, Busch and Larson had to navigate through lapped traffic with a total of 4 lapped cars bunched together all around them making it difficult for them to pass the cars. On the final lap, Larson had closed the gap to 0.35 seconds and attempted to pass Busch on the inside in turn one trying to use the slide job but failed to get in front of Busch. The two made contact with Larson putting Busch in the wall in turn 2. Down the backstretch, Larson took the lead from Busch heading into turn 3. Busch sent the car hard into turn 3 hitting Larson in the rear hard causing Larson to go sideways trying to save his car and Busch hit the wall again by driving his car deep into the corner. Busch ended up taking the win over Larson in one of the most memorable and craziest finishes in NASCAR history.

Final Stage Results

Stage 3
Laps: 107

Race statistics
 Lead changes: 10 among different drivers
 Cautions/Laps: 5 for 23
 Red flags: 0
 Time of race: 2 hours, 50 minutes and 52 seconds
 Average speed:

Media

Television
NBC Sports covered the race on the television side. Rick Allen, Jeff Burton, Steve Letarte, and 2005 race winner Dale Earnhardt Jr., in his debut as a color commentator for NASCAR on NBC, had the call in the booth for the race. Dave Burns, Marty Snider and Kelli Stavast reported from pit lane during the race.

Radio
The Motor Racing Network had the radio call for the race, which was simulcast on Sirius XM NASCAR Radio.

Standings after the race

Drivers' Championship standings

Manufacturers' Championship standings

Note: Only the first 16 positions are included for the driver standings.
. – Driver has clinched a position in the Monster Energy NASCAR Cup Series playoffs.

References

Overton's 400
Overton's 400
NASCAR races at Chicagoland Speedway
Overton's 400